Grays Creek is a  long 2nd order tributary to the Cape Fear River in Cumberland County, North Carolina.

Course
Grays Creek rises in Roslin, North Carolina and then flows in a southeasterly direction to join the Cape Fear River about 1 mile southwest of Lena, North Carolina.

Watershed
Grays Creek drains  of area, receives about 48.3 in/year of precipitation, has a wetness index of 559.06 and is about 15% forested.

See also
List of rivers of North Carolina

References

Rivers of North Carolina
Rivers of Cumberland County, North Carolina
Tributaries of the Cape Fear River